Todd Hedrick (born 1978) is an American philosopher and Professor of Philosophy at Michigan State University. He is known for his works on Hegel's philosophy and critical theory.

Books

References

External links
Todd Hedrick at MSU

21st-century American philosophers
Philosophy academics
Political philosophers
Hegel scholars
Michigan State University faculty
Northwestern University alumni
Swarthmore College alumni
Habermas scholars
Living people

1978 births